Jamal David Mayers (born October 24, 1974) is a Canadian former professional ice hockey winger who played 15 seasons in the National Hockey League (NHL). He spent time playing for the St. Louis Blues, Toronto Maple Leafs, Calgary Flames,  San Jose Sharks and won the Stanley Cup with the Chicago Blackhawks in 2013. He is currently an analyst for the NHL Network and NBC Sports Chicago.

Playing career
Prior to being drafted in the NHL, Mayers was a star player at Western Michigan University from 1992-96.

Mayers was drafted 89th overall by the St. Louis Blues in the 1993 NHL Entry Draft and played 10 seasons for the Blues until he was traded to the Toronto Maple Leafs in exchange for a third round pick in the 2008 NHL Entry Draft on June 19, 2008, one day before the draft.

On January 31, 2010, Mayers was traded along with Matt Stajan, Niklas Hagman and Ian White to the Calgary Flames for Dion Phaneuf, Fredrik Sjöström and prospect Keith Aulie. Mayers signed with the San Jose Sharks as a free agent at the end of the season for a one-year contract. On June 20, 2011, Sharks General Manager Doug Wilson announced that Mayers, and teammate Scott Nichol, would not be re-signed for the 2011–12 season.

On July 1, 2011, Mayers signed with the Chicago Blackhawks to a one-year contract worth $550,000. The Blackhawks re-signed Mayers to a one-year contract worth $600,000 for the 2012–13 season. During the 2011–12 season, Mayers was headbutted by the Minnesota Wild's Nate Prosser during a scrum in front of the net. Prosser apologized to Mayers after the game, and was given a one-game suspension for his actions by the NHL.

On June 24, 2013, Mayers won the Stanley Cup as a member of the Chicago Blackhawks when they defeated the Boston Bruins in Game 6 of the 2013 Stanley Cup Finals. This was Mayers' first Stanley Cup win in his 15 seasons in the NHL. His wait to hoist the trophy was recognized by his teammates, as he was the third person to hoist it, after Jonathan Toews and Michal Handzus. Despite him not playing in the 2013 Stanley Cup playoffs, the Blackhawks were successful in petitioning to have Mayers' name engraved on the Stanley Cup.

On December 13, 2013, Mayers officially announced his retirement from the NHL.

International play
Mayers was a member of the Canadian 2007 IIHF World Championship team that won gold in a 4–2 win against Finland in Moscow. He was also a member of the Canadian 2008 IIHF World Championship team, helping Canada take home the silver medal.

Broadcasting 
Mayers has been a pre-game, post-game, and intermission commentator for the Chicago Blackhawks on NBC Sports Chicago since the 2014-15 season while also serving as a community liaison for the Blackhawks.

Career statistics

Regular season and playoffs

International

See also
List of black NHL players

References

External links

1974 births
Living people
Black Canadian ice hockey players
Calgary Flames players
Canadian ice hockey centres
Canadian ice hockey right wingers
Canadian people of Barbadian descent
Chicago Blackhawks players
Hammarby Hockey (1921–2008) players
Ice hockey people from Toronto
Missouri River Otters players
St. Louis Blues draft picks
St. Louis Blues players
San Jose Sharks players
Stanley Cup champions
Toronto Maple Leafs players
Western Michigan Broncos men's ice hockey players
Worcester IceCats players
Canadian expatriate ice hockey players in Sweden